The Persecution and Assassination of Jean-Paul Marat as Performed by the Inmates of the Asylum of Charenton Under the Direction of the Marquis de Sade, usually shortened to Marat/Sade, is a 1967 British film adaptation of Peter Weiss' play Marat/Sade. The screen adaptation is directed by Peter Brook, and originated in his theatre production for the Royal Shakespeare Company. The English version was written by Adrian Mitchell from a translation by Geoffrey Skelton.

The cast included Ian Richardson, Patrick Magee, Glenda Jackson, Clifford Rose, and Freddie Jones. It was filmed at Pinewood Studios in Buckinghamshire and released by United Artists on 22 February 1967 in the United States, and 8 March 1967 in the United Kingdom. The film's score comprised Richard Peaslee's compositions. David Watkin was the cinematographer. The film uses the full title in the opening credits, though most of the publicity materials use the shortened form.

Plot
In the Charenton Asylum in 1808, the Marquis de Sade stages a play about the murder of Jean-Paul Marat by Charlotte Corday, using his fellow inmates as actors. The director of the hospital, Monsieur Coulmier, supervises the performance, accompanied by his wife and daughter. Coulmier, who supports Napoleon's government, believes that the play will support his own bourgeois ideas, and denounce those of the French Revolution that Marat helped lead. His patients, however, have other ideas, and they make a habit of speaking lines he had attempted to suppress, or deviating entirely into personal opinion. The Marquis himself, meanwhile, subtly manipulates both the players and the audience to create an atmosphere of chaos and nihilism that ultimately brings on an orgy of destruction.

Cast

Reception

Roger Ebert wrote, "The actors are superb. When we first see the Marquis (Patrick Magee), he looks steadily into the camera for half a minute and the full terror of his perversion becomes clearer than any dialog can make it. Glenda Jackson, as Marat's assassin Charlotte Corday, weaves back and forth between the melancholy of her mental illness and the fire of the role she plays. Ian Richardson, as Marat, still advocates violence and revolution even though thousands have died and nothing has been accomplished."

Film critic Leonard Maltin awarded the film 4 out of a possible 4 stars, calling the film "chilling", praising the film's atmosphere as being "...so vivid that it seems actors are breathing down your neck".

Accolades

Brook shared the Nastro d'Argento for Best Director of a Foreign Film with Robert Bresson, who was honored for Mouchette, and received Special Mention at the Locarno International Film Festival.

References

External links
 
 
 
 

1967 films
1960s political drama films
British political drama films
Films directed by Peter Brook
Films about the Marquis de Sade
British films based on plays
Films set in Paris
Films set in the 1790s
Films set in 1808
French Revolution films
Films about theatre
Films shot at Pinewood Studios
United Artists films
Cultural depictions of Jean-Paul Marat
Cultural depictions of Charlotte Corday
1960s historical drama films
British historical drama films
1960s English-language films
1960s British films